Abermeurig (also spelt Aber-meurig) is a small village in the county of Ceredigion, Wales.

Villages in Ceredigion